This is a list of Dutch television related events from 1970.

Events
11 February - Hearts of Soul are selected to represent Netherlands at the 1970 Eurovision Song Contest with their song "Waterman". They are selected to be the fifteenth Dutch Eurovision entry during Nationaal Songfestival held at Congresgebouw in The Hague.
21 March - The 15th Eurovision Song Contest is held at the RAI Congrescentrum in Amsterdam. Ireland wins the contest with the song "All Kinds of Everything", performed by Dana.

Debuts

Television shows

1950s
NOS Journaal (1956–present)
Pipo de Clown (1958-1980)

1960s
Stiefbeen en Zoon (1964-1971)

Ending this year

Births
8 September - Helga van Leur, weathergirl
24 December - Beau van Erven Dorens, actor, TV presenter & writer

Deaths